Flood's Ferry and Knight's End are hamlets between Benwick and March, Cambridgeshire, England. Flood's Ferry is the site of a large marina on the old course of the River Nene.

References

Hamlets in Cambridgeshire
Fenland District